Jules Maujean (22 February 1886 – 5 December 1966) was a French sports shooter. He competed in two events at the 1920 Summer Olympics.

References

External links
 

1886 births
1966 deaths
French male sport shooters
Olympic shooters of France
Shooters at the 1920 Summer Olympics
Place of birth missing